Bug Lake is located east of Inlet, New York. The outlet creek flows into Seventh Lake. Fish species present in the lake are lake trout, kokanee salmon, brown trout, brook trout, and rainbow smelt. There is carry down access off trail on the southwest shore. All hikers must register at Eighth Lake Campground.

References

Lakes of New York (state)
Lakes of Hamilton County, New York